Dana Hee (born as Dana Lynn Davidson on November 9, 1961 in Baton Rouge, Louisiana) is an American martial artist, stuntwoman, action film actress and model, who has also worked as sports color commentator, trainer, spokesperson, motivational speaker and master of ceremonies, as well as a rancher. She was a gold medalist at 1988 Summer Olympics in taekwondo (women's lightweight division).

Biography

Martial arts
Hee turned to martial arts as a way to regain confidence after having been a victim of sexual and domestic abuse.

She began training in Shotokan karate in 1980, before switching to taekwondo in 1984. Since 1989, she has also practiced many other styles for the films, including aikido, boxing, capoeira, jiu jitsu, kung fu, and wrestling.

Aside from her gold medal at the 1988 Summer Olympics, she won gold medals at the 1988 U.S. Olympic Team trials and finals, as well as in 21 national divisional tournaments from 1985 to 1987. She also won silver medals at the U.S. National Championships in 1986, 1987, and 1988, a bronze medal at the Universiade in 1986, four silver and one bronze medals in national divisional tournaments, and finished fifth in her division at the 1987 World Taekwondo Championships. She received the "Female Competitor of the Year Award" and inducted into the U.S. Grandmasters Society Hall of Fame in 2007,  and was inducted into the official Taekwondo Hall of Fame in 2013.

Film

Hee has performed stunts for dozens of films and TV series since 1993, including Batman Forever, Charlie's Angels, Gangs of New York, Independence Day, Lethal Weapon 4, Mortal Kombat, Spider-Man 2, Terminator 3: Rise of the Machines and The Avengers, and was a double for Cameron Diaz, Daryl Hannah, Geena Davis, Gwyneth Paltrow, Jennifer Garner, Nicole Kidman, Rene Russo, Sandra Bullock and Uma Thurman, among others.

Her acting roles included Mileena in Mortal Kombat: Annihilation, Siann in Mortal Kombat: Konquest, and the mutated Sil in Species.

Other activities
Hee has been a television color commentator (local, national, and intional taekwondo events), a master of ceremonies (USOC Olympic Academy, U.S. Olympic Festival), San Francisco-Seoul Sister City Fund raiser, television anchor for New Mexico celebrity golf tournament "Legends & Heroes".

She has transitioned from full-time stuntwoman to motivational speaking in the early 2000s. Since then, she has spoken for numerous groups and organizations, and contributed time and assistance to other philanthropic causes.

Dana's autobiography, One Step with Courage: The Story of My Life From Olympic Gold Medalist to Hollywood Stuntwoman, was released in May 2020.  Tae Kwon Do Life Magazine featured her story and book release in March, 2021, as part of its International Women's Day Celebration.

Personal life
She married and divorced Brian Hee, keeping his surname professionally.

References

External links
 
 

1961 births
Living people
Actresses from Baton Rouge, Louisiana
American color commentators
American aikidoka
American capoeira practitioners
American film actresses
American female karateka
American jujutsuka
American wushu practitioners
American stunt performers
American female taekwondo practitioners
American television actresses
Medalists at the 1988 Summer Olympics
Olympic gold medalists for the United States in taekwondo
Shotokan practitioners
Sportspeople from Baton Rouge, Louisiana
Taekwondo practitioners at the 1988 Summer Olympics
20th-century American women